Rosamund Everard-Steenkamp (1907–1946) was a South African aviator and artist. She was one of the first women to fly a jet airplane, the Gloster Meteor. She was also a talented artist whose work was shown at the South African National Art Gallery. She died in an airplane accident in England.

References

20th-century South African women artists
Aviation pioneers
Women aviation pioneers
1907 births
1946 deaths
Aviators killed in aviation accidents or incidents in England
Victims of aviation accidents or incidents in 1946
20th-century South African artists
South African aviators